Bernard Edgar "Barney" Wilson Jr. (February 23, 1912 – April 6, 1999) was the head coach for the William & Mary Tribe men's basketball team from 1947 to 1951. He led the Tribe to a 43–20 mark in Southern Conference play and 80–40 overall. Wilson holds the W&M all-time highest win percentage (.667) for men's basketball coaches who have coached 100+ games at the college.

Wilson attended Tennessee Wesleyan University and Eastern Kentucky University. He later worked in the insurance industry. He died in 1999.

Head coaching record

See also
 William & Mary scandal of 1951

References

1912 births
1999 deaths
American men's basketball coaches
Union Bulldogs and Lady Bulldogs athletic directors
William & Mary Tribe football coaches
William & Mary Tribe men's basketball coaches